The Fuller-Baker Log House is a historic home located at Grantsville, Garrett County, Maryland, United States. It is a two-story rectangular log home, constructed of log planks about 8 inches (20 cm) thick; some are 14 to 16 inches (36–41 cm) broad and a few are 26 feet (8 m) long. The house has been restored as an artist's studio and is an example of a log dwelling once common on the Allegheny frontier. Maryland's first governor, Thomas Johnson, owned the property when the house was built in 1815, but it is named for two later residents.

The Fuller-Baker Log House was listed on the National Register of Historic Places in 1971.

References

External links
, including undated photo, at Maryland Historical Trust

Houses in Garrett County, Maryland
Houses on the National Register of Historic Places in Maryland
Log houses in the United States
National Register of Historic Places in Garrett County, Maryland
Log buildings and structures on the National Register of Historic Places in Maryland
Houses completed in 1815
1815 establishments in Maryland
Thomas Johnson family